Kevin Jerome Gilyard (born February 5, 1986), better known by his stage name Kevin Gates, is an American rapper, singer, and entrepreneur. He is currently signed to Bread Winners' Association with a partnership with Atlantic Records. His debut studio album, Islah, released in January 2016 and peaked at number two on the US Billboard 200 chart. Prior to Islah, Gates also released a number of mixtapes, including Stranger Than Fiction (2013), By Any Means (2014), and Luca Brasi 2 (2014), all of which peaked in the top 40 on the Billboard 200 chart.

Early life
Kevin Jerome Gilyard was born on February 5, 1986, to a Puerto Rican mother and an African American father. He and his family relocated to New Orleans, Louisiana, before settling in Baton Rouge. Gates had an often tumultuous upbringing and was arrested for the first time in 1999 at the age of 13 for joyriding in a stolen vehicle as a passenger. He lost contact with his father at a young age, but he later reconnected with him as a teenager. His father died of complications from AIDS when Gates was 14 years old. When he was 17, he briefly attended Baton Rouge Community College. Gates is of Moroccan and Puerto Rican descent.

Career

2007–2012: Early career, setbacks, and Young Money
Gates began his career in 2007 by signing to local label Dead Game Records. His career blossomed along with fellow Baton Rouge natives Boosie Badazz and Webbie in the mid-2000s. The three collaborated on Gates' first mixtape, Pick of Da Litter, in 2007. Another mixtape, All or Nuthin, was released in 2008 and featured what Gates described as "a lot of pain...a lot of true stories." In 2008, both Gates and Boosie were incarcerated in separate cases, effectively pausing Gates' music career. He spent 31 months in prison between 2008 and 2011. During this time, Gates claimed he earned a master's degree in psychology through a prison program. He was released early from prison for good behavior.

After his stint in prison, Gates began working on music again almost immediately. In 2012, he earned some buzz with the mixtape Make 'Em Believe. He also caught the attention of Lil Wayne's record label, Young Money Entertainment. Gates was signed to the management wing of the label later that year. Although he was signed to the management wing, Gates never signed a record deal with Young Money. He noted, however, that it was Birdman who gave him the idea to start his own record label, named Bread Winners' Association, later on.

2013–2014: Atlantic Records and mixtape breakthroughs
In early 2013, Gates released the mixtape, The Luca Brasi Story, via his Bread Winners' Association record label. The mixtape received critical praise with Pitchfork saying it, "imbues trap's claustrophobic bleakness with an emotional nakedness, capable lyricism, and melodic certitude many of its recent breakout stars have lacked." Rolling Stone named the mixtape's single, "Wylin' ", the 40th best song of 2013. On the heels of the success of that mixtape, Gates was signed to Atlantic Records. He released his first major label mixtape, Stranger Than Fiction, in July 2013. The mixtape deals with issues ranging from depression to Gates' time in prison. The mixtape also received favorable reviews despite generally being shorter than Gates had originally hoped. Stranger Than Fiction also marked the first time one of Gates' mixtapes charted on the Billboard 200, peaking at number 37.

In support of the mixtape, Gates embarked on a 4-week tour in October across the United States called the Stranger Than Fiction Tour. The tour also featured Starlito and Don Trip. After the tour, Gates again found himself in prison for parole violations. He was sentenced to 4 months, but only served 3 and a half of those. Upon his release in early March 2014, he again focused on music and, in particular, his new mixtape project, By Any Means. The mixtape was released on March 18, 2014. The mixtape featured guest appearances from artists including 2 Chainz, Plies, and Rico Love. The mixtape also made it to the Billboard 200, peaking at number 17.

In May 2014, Gates was named a member of XXLs Freshman Class He also announced the By Any Means Tour, which would run from July 15 to August 30, 2014 and feature Chevy Woods. In August 2014, Gates announced the creation of a new energy drink called "I Don't Get Tired" or "#IDGT." The drink is based on Gates' 2014 single of the same name that also featured August Alsina.

2015–2016: Success with "I Don't Get Tired" and Islah
With the release of his 13th mixtape, Luca Brasi 2, Gates earned his third Billboard 200 listing in a row. The mixtape peaked at number 38. The mixtape featured the single "I Don't Get Tired" which became Gates' first song to make the US Billboard Hot 100 and his first song to be certified Gold. In February and March 2015, Gates embarked on the I Don't Get Tired Tour throughout much of the South.

In May 2015, Gates released another mixtape, Murder for Hire, which was said to be the third installment in the Luca Brasi series.

In July 2015, he released the song "Kno One", which would become the first single from his debut studio album, Islah.

In late August 2015, Gates was the subject of some controversy after a video surfaced of him allegedly kicking a female fan in the chest at a show in Lakeland, Florida. Gates responded to the allegations shortly thereafter in the form of a song called "The Truth," noting (among other things) that the fan had been tugging on his shorts. Later in October 2015, Gates announced the title and release date of his debut studio album, Islah, which means "to make better" in Arabic and is also the name of his firstborn daughter. The album was originally slated for release on December 11, 2015. The album would eventually be pushed back to January 29, 2016. It featured a total of four singles: "Kno One", "Time for That", "Really Really" and "2 Phones". Both "Really Really" and "2 Phones" received commercial success. The album sold 112,000 copies in the first week of its release and it also peaked at number two on the Billboard 200 chart. The album had almost no guest appearances with the exception of Trey Songz, Ty Dolla Sign, and Jamie Foxx who are all featured on the bonus track, "Jam". Islah received largely positive reviews with Inverse calling it the "Best Album of 2016 So Far". Pitchfork noted that it was "by far the best single release of his career."

2016–2018: Mixtape releases
On May 26, 2016, Gates announced that the sequel to Murder for Hire would be coming on May 27, 2016.

On September 22, 2017, Gates' spouse Dreka released By Any Means 2 while he remained in prison. She handled executive controls of the project. The mixtape reached number four on the Billboard 200.

In May 2018, Gates released the three-song EP Chained to the City. This serves as his first release since being released from prison.

2019: Only the Generals Gon Understand and I'm Him
On May 31, 2019, Gates released his second EP, titled Only the Generals Gon Understand.

On June 28, 2019, Gates released "Push It", along with the music video. The song served as the lead single from his second album I'm Him.

2021: Only the Generals, Pt. II and Khaza
On February 19, 2021, Gates returned with his first project since 2019 – his 17th mixtape, Only the Generals, Pt. II. Surprise-released, the project is the sequel to Gates' 2019 EP Only the Generals Gon Understand. The mixtape was recorded earlier in 2021 in Puerto Rico, with Gates explaining that this was done to celebrate his family heritage on the island. It contains the previously released single, "Plug Daughter 2", which was produced by Internet Money's Taz Taylor. The mixtape was accompanied with the release of a music video for the song, "Puerto Rico Luv", which reflects his appreciation for his heritage, along with the song "Cartel Swag". Gates has previously teased his third studio album, Khaza.

Artistry
Gates is known primarily for his "confessional anthems" that blend often autobiographical lyrics with refined Southern beats. In a review of his debut album Islah, Consequence of Sound noted that "autobiography and honesty have always been central to [Gates'] artistry." Spin has noted that Gates often combines "melodic tunefulness" and "clenched-teeth street rap." In recent releases, he has incorporated more singing, having trained with the singer, Monica. Gates' lyrics often deal with subjects like depression, poverty, and prison time. He has listed numerous artists among his influences including Nas, Biggie Smalls, Jay-Z, Tupac Shakur, Eminem, and others.

Personal life
Gates married his longtime girlfriend, Dreka Haynes, in October 2015. The couple have two children, Islah and Khaza. Gates hinted that he had children by other women in a 2013 interview with Complex: "I got some children. I'm real real close with them. I lay in the bed with them, hold them, love on them. It really doesn't make sense to say [how many kids I have]. Not in a bad way, but it's not like the public will ever get to see my children, and if they do see them, they aren't going to know they're mine."

Gates is a practicing Muslim along with his wife, and went in September 2016 to Mecca for Hajj.

Legal issues

As a minor 
Gates' first arrest occurred when he was 13 for being a passenger in a stolen vehicle. Gates was briefly jailed for the offense, and said that being jailed had a profound effect on his life: "If they would've just pulled up to the jail, left me in the police car, never took me inside and just took me back home, I don't think I'd ever have done anything else again. But what it did was—by me going into jail at such a young age—all it did was criminalize me in a sense. It kinda steered me in the wrong direction after getting there and settling in; it took the fear of jail away from me."

In 2003, Gates was involved in an altercation outside a movie theatre and stabbed his opponent multiple times.

Battery charge 
Gates was charged with battery for kicking a fan in the summer of 2015 while he was performing on stage at an event in Lakeland, Florida. He used Florida's stand-your-ground law in defense. On October 26, 2016, he was convicted of the charge and sentenced to 180 days in jail.

Felon in possession of a firearm charge 
Gates was sentenced to a 30-month prison term at the East Moline, IL correctional facility for gun charges stemming from a warrant which arose from an October 2013 arrest in Chicago. Gates failed to show up in court in Illinois, leading to his warrant being reissued in December 2016, while he was serving his battery sentence (see section preceding).

He was released on parole on January 10, 2018.

Parole (Gilyard v. Baldwin, et al.) 
In April 2018, Gates filed a lawsuit (Kevin Gilyard v. John R. Baldwin, Ned Shwartz, and Jason Garnett) against his parole officer, the director of the Illinois Department of Corrections (DOC), and its chief of parole for denying his requests to travel outside of Cook County, Illinois, where he was serving his probation, to perform and visit family. He claimed to have missed multiple shows in the intervening months. The case, heard in the USDC for the Northern District of Illinois, where it was dismissed on May 2, 2018 in a minute order following a summary hearing.

Gates filed an emergency petition requesting injunctive relief in the US Court of Appeals for the 7th Circuit, which heard the case beginning on May 7, 2018. On May 9, 2018, a three judge panel dismissed his emergency petition, and scheduled the case to be heard non-urgently at a later date.

On June 18, Gates was granted his requested voluntary dismissal of his own case (FRAP 42(b)) as the issue had become moot—his parole was terminated early by the Illinois DOC in motu proprio. Gates was therefore no longer under either the authority of his parole officer or that of the  agreement that had been at issue. After Ilia Usharovich, Gates' attorney, confirmed that the issue was moot as Gates' parole ended early, the lower court dismissed the case.

Although he missed the JMBLYA music festival in Austin, Texas, which he originally filed his petitions to attend, Gates was able to return to live performances at The Novos in Los Angeles the following June. Gates' parole had originally been projected to expire on January 10, 2019.

Discography 

 Islah (2016)
 I'm Him (2019)
 Khaza (2022)

References

External links 

1986 births
Living people
American people of Puerto Rican descent
American people of Moroccan descent
Hispanic and Latino American rappers
African-American male rappers
African-American Muslims
Rappers from Louisiana
Rappers from New Orleans
Atlantic Records artists
Gangsta rappers
Converts to Islam
McKinley Senior High School alumni
21st-century American rappers
21st-century American male musicians
21st-century African-American male singers